Tobias Malm (born 21 January 1992) is a Swedish footballer who plays for Vinberg as a defender.

Club career

Malmö FF 
Malm made his Allsvenskan debut in a match against IF Elfsborg on 24 April 2011. He scored the 2–1 goal against AC Milan in an exhibition game in August 2011, he played the game as left midfielder.

Loan periods 
Malm was loaned to newly relegated Trelleborgs FF for the duration of the 2012 season. Malm played 23 matches out of 30 and scored one goal in 2012 Superettan for Trelleborg. At the end of the season Trelleborg was relegated once again.

It was announced on 19 December 2012 that Malm would be on loan to Superettan side Landskrona BoIS for the duration of the 2013 season. In total Malm played 14 league matches during this loan spell. For the 2014 season Malm was sent on loan to Superettan club Östersunds FK

Career statistics 
As of 2 November 2014.

References

External links 
 Tobias Malm at Malmö FF 
  (archive)
  (archive)
 

1992 births
Malmö FF players
Trelleborgs FF players
Landskrona BoIS players
Östersunds FK players
Allsvenskan players
Superettan players
Swedish footballers
Sweden youth international footballers
Sweden under-21 international footballers
Footballers from Skåne County
Living people
Association football defenders